Swithinbank Moraine is a spectacular medial moraine in the Shackleton Glacier. It trends northward from Matador Mountain. Named by the Southern Party of the New Zealand Geological Survey Antarctic Expedition (NZGSAE) (1961–62) for Charles W. Swithinbank, a member of the University of Michigan glaciological and survey parties to the major glaciers feeding the Ross Ice Shelf in 1960-61 and 1961–62.

References

Moraines of the Ross Dependency
Dufek Coast